Heather Standring (born 1928) is a British illustrator.

Standring was born in Olveston, Gloucestershire in 1928. She trained at London's Central School of Arts and Crafts.

She designed book dust jackets for Brian Moore's Judith Hearne, and Kay Dick's Solitaire. And for Wolf Mankowitz's Laugh Till You Cry, Donald Windham's The Warm Country and Ernest Frost's The Visitants.

Standring taught illustration part-time for many years at Maidstone College of Art.

References

Living people
1928 births
British illustrators
People from Olveston
Alumni of the Central School of Art and Design